Carona may refer to:

Places
Carona, Lombardy, a comune in the Province of Bergamo, Italy
Carona, Switzerland, a comune in the Canton of Ticino, Switzerland
Carona, Kansas, United States

People
Mike Carona, former Sheriff of Orange County, California

See also
Corona (disambiguation)